Wilfred Chinoye Osuji (born 5 August 1990) is a Nigerian professional footballer who plays as a midfielder for Italian  club Trento.

Club career 
A product of Milan's youth system, Osuji was loaned out to Varese for the 2009–10 season. He made his official debut for the club on 23 August, in a match against Perugia. On 22 November, he also scored his first goal, in a home game against Foligno. On 7 July 2010, Varese announced to have signed the Nigerian on a co-ownership deal, for €10,000.

In summer 2011, Padova bought Varese's half for €310,000.

References

External links 
 Squad list at official club website 
 Squad list at Soccerway.com 
 Profile at official club website 
 
 Profile at Assocalciatori.it 
 Profile at EmozioneCalcio.it 
 Profile at Calcio-talenti.it 
 Profile at Goal.com 
 Profile at Eurorivals.net 

1990 births
Living people
Sportspeople from Lagos
Nigerian footballers
Association football midfielders
Serie B players
Serie C players
Serie D players
A.C. Milan players
S.S.D. Varese Calcio players
Calcio Padova players
Modena F.C. players
A.C. Reggiana 1919 players
U.S. Savoia 1908 players
A.C. Trento 1921 players
Nigerian expatriate footballers
Nigerian expatriate sportspeople in Italy
Expatriate footballers in Italy